Tonči is a Croatian and Slovene masculine given name used as a diminutive form of Anton, Antonij and Antonijo in Croatia and Slovenia. It is sometimes spelled Tonci in Croatia where it is sometimes a diminutive form of Antonio. Notable people with this name include the following:

Tonči Bašić (born 1974), Croatian footballer
Tonči Boban (born 1971), Croatian footballer
Tonči Gabrić (born 1961), Croatian footballer
Tonči Gulin (born 1938), Croatian footballer
Tonči Huljić (born 1961), Croatian musician, songwriter and music producer
Tonći Kukoč (born 1990), Croatian footballer and nephew of Toni Kukoč
Tonči Martić (born 1972), Croatian former footballer
Tonči Matulić (born 1966), Croatian Roman Catholic priest
Tonći Mujan (born 1995), Croatian footballer 
Tonči Peribonio (born 1960), Croatian team handball player 
Tonći Pirija (born 1980), Croatian footballer
Tonči Restović (born 1977), Croatian darts player
Tonči Stipanović (born 1986), Croatian sailor
Tonči Valčić (born 1978), Croatian handball player
Tonči Žilić (born 1975), Croatian footballer
Tonči Zonjić (born 1986), Croatian comic book artist

See also

Salvatore Tonci (1756 - 1844), Italian painter, musician, singer and poet
Tonic Chabalala
Toci (disambiguation)
Tonciu (disambiguation)
Toni (disambiguation)
Tonic (disambiguation)

Notes

Croatian masculine given names
Slovene masculine given names